Fluckite is an arsenate mineral with the chemical formula CaMnH2(AsO4)2·2(H2O). 

Fluckite's mineral crystallography is triclinic meaning it has three axis of different length and three different interior angles that do not equal 90°. Because fluckite possesses three axes with different angles and lengths it is an anisotropic mineral. This means that it has more than one optic axis. This mineral is a member of the P space group meaning that it can be rotated 360° degrees and inverted to obtain the original figure. Optically, this mineral has positive biaxial birefringence, which can be shown obtaining an interference figure that is blue in the upper right and lower left quadrants of the figure while looking down the c- axis. Fluckite possesses moderate optical relief which is the degree to which the mineral stands out from the mounting medium.

Occurrence
Fluckite was first described in 1980 for an occurrence in the Gabe-Gottes Mine in Haut-Rhin, Alsace, France, and named for mineralogist Pierre Fluck of Louis Pasteur University in Strasbourg, France. It occurs as a post-mine phase on carbonate gangue. It occurs in association with native arsenic, tennantite, skutterudite, sainfeldite, pharmacolite, villyaellenite, picropharmacolite, calcite, dolomite, ankerite and quartz.

References

Arsenate minerals
Calcium minerals
Manganese(II) minerals
Triclinic minerals
Minerals in space group 2